The Illustrious Citizen of Buenos Aires is a recognition provided by the city of Buenos Aires, for people who made a fine work in culture, science, sports or politics. It is granted by the legislature of Buenos Aires, and must be approved by two thirds of the body. It can be received by either a native-born Porteño or by someone who has lived in Buenos Aires for at least 10 years.

It may not be received by people that committed crimes against humanity, or who took part in military dictatorships in Argentina.

Notable people
 María Hortensia Lacau (1910-2006), Argentine pedagogue, writer, essayist, poet, educator

References

External links

 
Argentine awards